Pogonophora is a plant genus of the family Peraceae first described as a genus in 1854. It is native to central Africa and northern South America.

Species
 Pogonophora letouzeyi Feuillet, 1993 - Gabon, Congo 
 Pogonophora schomburgkiana Miers ex Benth., 1854 - Colombia, Venezuela, Guyana, Suriname, Fr Guinea, N + E Brazil

formerly included
moved to other genera (Micrandra, Pausandra)
 P. cunuri  - Micrandra spruceana 
 P. trianae - Pausandra trianae

References

Malpighiales genera
Peraceae